Kabaret OT.TO is a Polish musical comedy group founded in 1987 by Wiesław Tupaczewski. The group officially started on 1 January 1990, in a line-up consisting of Ryszard Makowski, Andrzej Piekarczyk, Andrzej Tomanek and Wiesław Tupaczewski.

OT.TO is one of the first Polish comedy groups to explore themes other than the political realms of the absurd. The best known songs of Kabaret OT.TO are: "Zasmażka", "Wakacje" and "To już lato". The group has enjoyed its greatest popularity from the early '90s to the early 2000s.  Tupaczewski created the groups's name and stage dressing, while the logo – the razor blade – was designed by friend of the group Jacek Sasin.

Discography
 1992 – Faux-Pas
 1992 – Lato z z OT.TO
 1993 – Koncert Kabaretu OT.TO z orkiestrą Zbigniewa Górnego
 1993 – OT.TO dzieciom
 1994 – 50-lecie Kabaretu OT.TO
 1995 – Wesele Hamleta
 1997 – 7777
 1998 – Umciaciarumcia
 2000 – Dzieła Wybrane
 2002 – Czego.../Los Piernikos

Gold and platinum discs

Gold discs
 1997 – Lato z OT.TO
 1999 – 50-lecie Kabaretu OT.TO
 1999 – Wesele Hamleta

Platinum discs
 1999 – Faux-Pas
 1999 – Koncert Kabaretu OT.TO z orkiestrą Zbigniewa Górnego

External links
 Official Cabaret OT.TO Site
 Unofficial Cabaret OT.TO Site

Cabaret in Europe
Musical groups established in 1987
Polish entertainers
Polish musical groups